The following is a list of Malayalam films released in the year 1978.

Dubbed films

References

 1978
1978
Malayalam
Fil